159th Division may refer to:

159th Division (People's Republic of China)
159th Infantry Division "Veneto"
159th Infantry Division (Wehrmacht)

Military units and formations disambiguation pages